The 1986 Boston College Eagles football team represented Boston College as an independent during the 1986 NCAA Division I-A football season. The Eagles were led by sixth-year head coach Jack Bicknell and played their home games at Alumni Stadium in Chestnut Hill, Massachusetts. They also played an alternate-site home game at Sullivan Stadium (later known as Foxboro Stadium) in Foxborough, Massachusetts. Boston College ended the season on an eight-game winning streak, capped by the 1986 Hall of Fame Bowl, where they defeated Georgia, 27–24 on a last-minute touchdown pass from Shawn Halloran to Kelvin Martin.

Schedule

References

Boston College
Boston College Eagles football seasons
ReliaQuest Bowl champion seasons
Boston College Eagles football
Boston College Eagles football